Prince Chestnut is a member of the Alabama House of Representatives, representing district 67. He was elected into office on April 18, 2017.
Chestnut is also the presiding municipal court judge for the city of Selma, Alabama.

Prior to his career in politics, Chestnut worked in law.

References

External links

Living people
Democratic Party members of the Alabama House of Representatives
Year of birth missing (living people)
African-American state legislators in Alabama
21st-century American politicians
Auburn University alumni
Southern University alumni
Alabama lawyers
21st-century African-American politicians